Grice commonly refers to:
Grice, an extinct breed of pig from Scotland and Ireland
Paul Grice, a British philosopher of language.

It may also refer to:

•Grice, slang for trainspotting. ('griceing')

People

Grice
Allan Grice, is an Australian former racing driver.
Christine Grice, a judge of New Zealand and the Cook Islands
Frank Grice, was an English professional footballer.
Gary Grice, better known by his stage names GZA, is an American hip hop artist.
Gigi Gryce, an American saxophonist, flautist, clarinetist, composer, arranger, educator, and big band bandleader.
Gordon Grice, an American nature writer and essayist.
Jeffrey Grice a  New Zealand musician.
John Grice, was an Australian business man.
Kliti Grice, Australian scientist
Matt Grice, an American mixed martial artist.
Mike Grice, an English footballer
Neve Grice (1881–1950), English footballer
Paul Grice, (1913-1988), a British philosopher of language.
Reuben Grice, an English professional association football player.
Ryan Grice-Mullen, an American Football player.
Warren Grice Elliott, president of the Atlantic Coast Line Railroad.
Marie Grice Young, a passenger on the RMS Titanic and a piano teacher.

Le Grice
Charles Valentine Le Grice, an Anglican priest.
Edwin Le Grice, an eminent Anglican priest.

Fictional characters
Judge Grice, a fictional character in the Judge Dredd comic strip.

See also
Grice House (disambiguation)